The Burlington Headquarters Building, also called Burlington Place, is located at 1004 Farnam Street in Downtown Omaha, Nebraska. This four-story brick building was originally designed by Alfred R. Dufrene and built in 1879 next to Jobbers Canyon. It was redesigned by noted Omaha architect Thomas R. Kimball in 1899, and vacated by the railroad in 1966. The building was listed on the National Register of Historic Places in 1974, designated an Omaha Landmark in 1978, and rehabilitated in 1983. Today it is office space.

Usage
The building was constructed for the Burlington and Missouri River Railroad at a cost of $40,000. The Chicago, Burlington and Quincy Railroad took ownership when it took over that company. The first floor was leased by a wholesale grocer and a wholesale notion dealer, with upper floors used as headquarters for the railroad.

Design

Designed in the Italianate style in 1879, the original three-story building was constructed with load-bearing masonry walls on a foundation of limestone blocks. A flat roof, straight front and walls, and very little embellishment originally made this building virtually indistinguishable from its neighbors in the Jobbers Canyon. The structure had fireproof vaults on each floor and each office was finished in oiled southern pine. Several offices included fireplaces.

The railroad bought the lot west of the building in 1886, and the building expanded westward and upward, adding fourth floor. Unlike those on the lower floors, the new fourth floor had arched  windows and a heavy ornamental cornice, making the building more distinguishable than its neighbors.

In 1899 Thomas R. Kimball was commissioned to remodel the building. His new  plans closely resembled the Chicago, Burlington and Quincy Railroad Company Building in Chicago, Illinois. Gutting the building, he placed a central atrium and an open staircase with galleries overlooking a courtyard. An elevator lined with quartersawn oak resembled much of the building's new interior, which Kimball also designed. Features include a combination of skylights, cast iron railings, staircases, columns, and ornamental detailing.

The railroad occupied the building until 1966, when it sat empty for several years. A 1983 rehabilitation converted the entire building into office space that closely matched original designs. Many of the original elements, including the stairway and balconies, remain. Part of the original cast-iron Farnam Street facade remains; and although the original atrium elevator was replaced, a new elevator occupies the same area as the original.

The Gene Leahy Mall wraps around the building today, and is on the outskirts of the Old Market Historic District and is across the street from the Nash Block.

See also
 Railroads in Omaha
 Burlington Station

References

External links
 Burlington Place

Commercial buildings completed in 1879
Thomas Rogers Kimball buildings
National Register of Historic Places in Omaha, Nebraska
Omaha Landmarks
History of Downtown Omaha, Nebraska
Chicago, Burlington and Quincy Railroad
Rail transportation in Nebraska
Commercial buildings on the National Register of Historic Places in Nebraska